Adam John Lusker Sr. is an American politician who served in the Kansas House of Representatives as a Democrat from the 2nd district from 2014 to 2019.

Lusker was appointed to fill the remaining year of Robert Grant's term in the House, when Grant resigned in December 2013. Lusker was elected in his own right in 2014; he faced no opposition in either the primary or general elections.
He was re-elected in 2016, similarly without opposition, but in 2018 he was narrowly defeated in the general election by Republican Ken Collins, losing with 49.6% of the vote.

References

Living people
Democratic Party members of the Kansas House of Representatives
21st-century American politicians
People from Frontenac, Kansas
Place of birth missing (living people)
Year of birth uncertain
Year of birth missing (living people)